Shane Geoffrey Jones (born 3 September 1959) is a New Zealand politician. He served as a New Zealand First list MP from 2017 to 2020 and was previously a Labour list MP from 2005 to 2014.

Jones was a cabinet minister in the Fifth Labour Government of New Zealand, becoming Minister of Building and Construction in his first term. He was a senior opposition MP from 2008 to 2014 and contested the leadership of the Labour Party in a 2013 leadership election, but lost to David Cunliffe. He left parliament at the end of May 2014 before returning as a New Zealand First MP at the 2017 general election. Jones was Minister for Regional Economic Development in the New Zealand First–Labour coalition government.

Early life and career
Jones is Māori, of Te Aupōuri and Ngāi Takoto descent, as well as having English, Welsh and Croatian ancestry. He was born in Awanui, near Kaitaia, one of six children to parents Peter, a farmer, and Ruth, a teacher.

Jones' secondary education was taken at St Stephen's School, a boarding school for Māori boys in Bombay, south of Auckland. His time there overlapped with future Māori Party MPs Hone Harawira and Te Ureroa Flavell. Jones next studied at Victoria University of Wellington where he earned a Bachelor of Arts. In 1990, he was awarded a Harkness Fellowship to study at Harvard Kennedy School at Harvard University where he completed a Master of Public Administration. Jones returned to Victoria University in the 1990s as a lecturer in Māori studies.

Jones was a public servant in the 1980s. He worked in the Māori secretariat in the Ministry for the Environment and later in the Department of the Prime Minister and Cabinet, providing advice to the Fourth Labour Government on settling Treaty of Waitangi breaches. When the Fourth National Government began the settlements process in the 1990s, he was brought on as a member of the Treaty of Waitangi Fisheries Commission. He became chair of the commission in August 2000 and completed the allocation of fisheries resources among iwi in 2004. He also chaired the Māori-owned fishing corporation Sealord during which period the company was merged with Nippon Suisan Kaisha. A 2004 "power list" by the New Zealand Listener ranked him the ninth most powerful New Zealander.

Jones has seven children with his former wife Ngāreta, from whom he separated in 2011. She died from cancer in 2015. Jones began a relationship with former beauty queen Dorothy (Dot) Pumihi in 2011 while she was his campaign manager.

Member of Parliament

Jones spent twelve years as a member of Parliament—first with the Labour Party for nine years from 2005 to 2014, then with New Zealand First from 2017 to 2020—and was a Cabinet minister under both parties. 

Although he had often been speculated by the media and among his colleagues as a future leader of the Labour Party, Jones' move away from Labour was not a surprise. Before his election as a Labour MP, Sir Graham Latimer had tried, unsuccessfully, to recruit him for the National Party. Instead, Jones joined Labour in part because he had been impressed by David Lange and the Fourth Labour Government. Over time he felt less comfortable in the "modern Labour Party," and openly stated in 2014 that he was not "naturally left-leaning." He had been speculated as a New Zealand First candidate since at least 2015 before officially joining the party in 2017, in part due to his close relationship with New Zealand First leader Winston Peters.

Fifth Labour Government, 2005–2008
After the fisheries settlement was passed by Parliament in 2004, Jones announced he was interested in standing for the Labour Party at the upcoming election. He was approved as the candidate for the Northland electorate and was ranked 27 on the party list. This was the highest position given by Labour to someone who was not already a member of Parliament. While Jones did not win Northland, he entered Parliament as a list MP and was immediately made the chair of the Finance and Expenditure Select Committee. 

On 31 October 2007, by then still in his first term, Jones was promoted into Cabinet. He became Minister for Building and Construction and held additional responsibilities as associate minister in charge of Treaty of Waitangi Negotiations, Immigration and Trade. He scrapped a government proposal requiring new buildings to have low flow showers heads, prior to the 2008 general election.

Opposition, 2008–2014 
Labour was defeated at the election and Jones contested the Northland electorate unsuccessfully, but was returned to parliament as a list member due to his high list placing of 16. Labour lost again in the 2011 election; Jones was defeated in Tāmaki Makaurau but remained a list MP. During his six years as an opposition MP, Jones held various portfolios in the Goff, Shearer and Cunliffe shadow cabinets including building and construction, infrastructure, economic development, transport, fisheries, forestry and Māori affairs.

He was twice removed from his portfolios under controversy. On 10 June 2010, after the release of ministerial credit card records, Jones admitted to having used a Crown credit card for personal expenditure, but assured the public that he had reimbursed the Crown in full for the expenditure. Later that day Jones admitted that he had used the card to hire pornographic films at hotels while on ministerial business. The credit card record showed that he chartered an executive jet for $1200, which he claimed was due to bad weather which forced a change in his schedule. Four days later, opposition leader Phil Goff demoted Jones along with two other Labour MPs for misuse of ministerial credit cards.

As Associate Minister of Immigration in 2008, Jones approved the citizenship application of Labour Party donor, Chinese businessman and later convicted money launderer William Yan, also known as Bill Liu. Four years later, Yan was charged with making false declarations on immigration documents. On 23 May 2012, Jones stood down from the front bench and his shadow portfolios while an investigation took place. Labour Party leader David Shearer asked the Auditor-General to investigate Jones' handling of the citizenship application. Jones had acted against officials' advice that he should decline the application because of questions about Yan's multiple identities and a warrant for his arrest in China. Jones defended his decision, saying it was based on humanitarian grounds because a high-level Government official had told him that Yan faced execution if he returned to China. Shearer said Jones supported the decision to refer the matter to the Auditor-General because Jones must be given a chance to clear his name. On 24 May 2012, Yan was found not guilty on all the immigration charges. The Auditor-General investigation commenced on 30 May 2012. When it reported back the following year, it found no evidence that there was any improper motive, collusion, or political interference in the decision to authorise citizenship.

In 2014, while economic development spokesperson, Jones alleged that Progressive Enterprises, owner of Countdown supermarkets, was involved in racketeering and extortion. A Commerce Commission investigation found no evidence to support the claims.

Leadership contest and resignation 
David Shearer resigned the Labour leadership in August 2013. Jones was the second MP to declare his candidacy, following Shearer's former deputy leader Grant Robertson. The pair would be joined by the party's economic development spokesperson David Cunliffe, who secured sufficient support from party delegates to win the leadership. Jones later said his candidacy was to honour Labour stalwart Parekura Horomia who had died earlier that year. Jones won the votes of seven out of 34 caucus colleagues and a minority of members' and affiliated unions' votes. Crucially, he did not have the support of senior Māori Labour MPs Nanaia Mahuta and Louisa Wall.

On 22 April 2014, Jones announced his intention to step down as a Labour Party MP, leaving at the end of May. He was appointed to the newly created role of Pacific Economic Ambassador by Foreign Affairs Minister Murray McCully. Kelvin Davis succeeded him as Labour list MP.

New Zealand First

On 30 June 2017, after months of speculation, Jones was confirmed as the New Zealand First candidate for Whangarei for the 2017 general election. Jones was also placed eighth on the party list for New Zealand First, above some of the members of the New Zealand First caucus of the Parliament at the time,  increasing his chances of re-entering Parliament.
New Zealand online magazine, The Spinoff hosted a live debate on Facebook, among seven of the 2017 election's candidates that the magazine found "most exciting", including Jones, representing New Zealand First. Jones placed third in Whangarei, behind National candidate Shane Reti and Labour candidate Tony Savage, but was elected as one of New Zealand First's nine list MPs.

New Zealand First held the balance of power. Jones was part of the negotiating team that ultimately saw Winston Peters select a coalition with Labour over National. Jones was appointed Minister for Infrastructure, Minister of Forestry and Minister for Regional Economic Development and associate minister for finance and transport. As Minister for Regional Economic Development Jones was responsible for the $3 billion Provincial Growth Fund and announced a number of grants for the development of various regions, e.g. for Southland, the West Coast and the Wairarapa. The first grants in February 2018 included $6 million for the Whanganui rail line, $5 million for the Napier-Wairoa rail line and $2.3 million for the Gisborne port. Further grants were announced for Hillside Engineering in South Dunedin ($20million) as a major heavy engineering and KiwiRail servicing hub. The fund was criticised by National for being a "slush fund" targeted toward marginal electorates and for the links between some fund applications and New Zealand First. 

Jones continued to court controversy in his new party. On 25 September 2019, Jones and Labour MP Kieran McAnulty were ejected from Parliament by the Speaker of the House Trevor Mallard after trading barbs with National MPs during a parliamentary debate about Prime Minister Jacinda Ardern's meeting with US President Donald Trump. In mid-October 2019, Jones drew media attention when he was photographed using an AR-15 style rifle while on holiday. The AR-15 rifle was among the semi-automatic weapons banned by New Zealand Government's Arms (Prohibited Firearms, Magazines, and Parts) Amendment Act 2019 following the Christchurch mosque shootings.

Jones drew further criticism when he made a series of anti-Indian remarks in October and November 2019 and again in February 2020. In response to members of the Indian New Zealand community's criticism of Immigration New Zealand's recent decision to tighten partnership visas for those on arranged marriages, Jones had said: 

Jones' comments were condemned by the Waitakere Indian Association, who called on Prime Minister Jacinda Ardern and Minister for Ethnic Communities Jenny Salesa to demand a public apology from Jones and to address the Indian community's concerns. A rally in protest of Jones' remarks was held on 3 November 2019 by members of the Migrant Workers Association and Love Aotearoa Hate Racism. 
Jones' remarks were also condemned by the broadcaster Patrick Gower, who described Jones as a "gutless wonder." Prime Minister Ardern, Trade Minister Damien O'Connor, and Immigration Minister Iain Lees-Galloway have disavowed Jones' remarks as not representative of the New Zealand Government. On 5 November 2019, Jones described the community response as a "Bollywood reaction" and claimed that he was speaking for New Zealanders who were anxious about immigration. On 6 November 2019, the Government reversed the partnership visa  decision, restoring the exception for non-resident Indian marriages.

The following year, Jones claimed in a television interview that immigration was placing "enormous stress" on the country's social and economic infrastructure and that the large number of international students from India had ruined New Zealand tertiary institutions. Jones' remarks were criticised by Prime Minister Ardern, the Waitakere Indian Association, National Party leader Simon Bridges, Green Party co-leader James Shaw, and Labour MP Iain Lees-Galloway. The Race Relations Commissioner Meng Foon also condemned them as "racist, ignorant and harmful." Jones defended his comments, claiming that members of the Indian community were exploiting their own people.

As Forestry Minister, Jones' flagship policy was to plant one billion trees. A farmers' protest in November 2019 against the Government's forestry policy caught Jones' ire; he described them as "rednecks." Federated Farmers vice president Andrew Hoggard described Jones' comments as unhelpful and alleged that the Government was ignoring the agricultural sector's concerns. In 2020, Jones described climate change activists for advocating reduced meat consumption as "medieval torture chamber workers" hellbent on "preaching this gospel of absolutism" in response to the Government's recent announcement that they would be introducing climate change education in schools.

Jones was selected as New Zealand First's Northland candidate for the 2020 election. He was defeated, coming third place with 5,119 votes behind Labour's Willow-Jean Prime (17,066) and National's Matt King (16,903). New Zealand First also lost all its parliamentary seats, gaining only 2.6% percent of the party vote, below the five percent threshold needed to enter Parliament. Since leaving Parliament for the second time, Jones has provided media commentary critical of the Sixth Labour Government.

Notes

References

External links

Valedictory speech at Inthehouse.co.nz
Profile on NZ Parliament site

|-

|-

|-

|-

1959 births
Living people
New Zealand people of English descent
New Zealand people of Welsh descent
New Zealand people of Croatian descent
Te Aupōuri people
Ngāi Takoto people
Harvard Kennedy School alumni
Harkness Fellows
New Zealand Labour Party MPs
Māori MPs
People from the Northland Region
New Zealand list MPs
Members of the New Zealand House of Representatives
21st-century New Zealand politicians
New Zealand First MPs
Members of the Cabinet of New Zealand
Government ministers of New Zealand
Candidates in the 2017 New Zealand general election
Unsuccessful candidates in the 2020 New Zealand general election